The Dawn Staley Award was established in 2013 to "recognize the nation’s best guard in Women’s Division I college basketball". It was established by the Phoenix club of Philadelphia, an organization established to recognize the achievements of outstanding male and female basketball players. The award was named after Dawn Staley, a Philadelphia native recognized as one of the nation's best guards in women's college basketball history. The organization establish a watchlist of potential winners during the year and at the end of the season selects the player who "exemplifies the skills that Dawn possessed throughout her career; ball handling, scoring, her ability to distribute the basketball and her will to win".

Winners

See also
 List of sports awards honoring women

References 

College basketball trophies and awards in the United States
Awards established in 2013
College sports trophies and awards in the United States
Sports awards honoring women